The states of Mexico are first-level administrative divisions of the country of Mexico, which is officially named United Mexican States. There are 32 federal entities in Mexico (31 states and the capital, Mexico City, as a separate entity that is not formally a state).

States are further divided into municipalities.

List
Mexico's post agency, Correos de México, does not offer an official list of state name abbreviations, and as such, they are not included below.  A list of Mexican states and several versions of their abbreviations can be found here.

Notes:

See also

 Administrative divisions of Mexico
 List of current state governors in Mexico
 List of Mexican state demonyms
 List of Mexican state governors
 List of Mexican state legislatures (Current composition)
 List of Mexican states by area
 List of Mexican states by HDI
 List of Mexican states by population
 Mexican state name etymologies
 Postal codes in Mexico
 Ranked list of Mexican states
 State flags of Mexico
 State governments of Mexico
 Territorial evolution of Mexico

References

 

Mexico